Trinity Road Library is an historic building situated on Trinity Road, St Philips, Bristol, England.

The library was constructed in 1896 in a Jacobethan style, to the plans of William Venn Gough, and bears an inscription with its original name, St Philips Public Library. It closed as a public library on 28 November 2012.

It has been designated by English Heritage as a grade II listed building.

See also
Trinity Centre
Trinity Road (police station)
Bristol Central Library

References

Public libraries in Bristol
Library buildings completed in 1896
Jacobethan architecture
Grade II listed buildings in Bristol
Grade II listed library buildings